Van Vollenhoven is a Dutch and Afrikaans surname. Notable people with the surname include:

Cornelis van Vollenhoven (1874–1933), Dutch academic and legal scholar
Joost van Vollenhoven (1877–1918), Dutch-born French soldier and colonial administrator
Pieter van Vollenhoven (born 1939), Dutch royalty
Tom van Vollenhoven (born 1935), South African rugby player
Samuel Constantinus Snellen van Vollenhoven (1816-1880) Dutch entomologist

See also
Vollenhoven

Dutch-language surnames
Afrikaans-language surnames
Surnames of Dutch origin